In theatre studies, didaskalia is anything written within a play text that is not directly spoken by a character.  The term is the modern re-use of the theatrical term of the classical antiquity διδασκαλία literally meaning "teaching", "instruction".

See also
Didascaliae

References

Theatre studies